Lakhantari is a village development committee in Morang District in the Kosi Zone of south-eastern Nepal. At the time of the 1991 Nepal census it had a population of 3320 people living in 623 individual households.

References

Village development committees in Morang District
Gramthan Rural Municipality